Wais Ibrahim Khairandesh (born 31 December 1990) is a male Afghan middle-distance runner. He currently holds the Afghanistan national record in the 800m with a time of 1:53.62, which he accomplished in Portland, Oregon, USA. He competed in the 800 metres event at the 2015 World Championships in Athletics in Beijing, China.

Competition record

References

Afghan male middle-distance runners
Living people
Place of birth missing (living people)
1989 births
World Athletics Championships athletes for Afghanistan